Lee Stephen Mead (born 14 July 1981) is an English musical theatre, television actor and occasional singer, best known for winning the title role in the 2007 West End revival of Joseph and the Amazing Technicolor Dreamcoat through the BBC TV casting show Any Dream Will Do.  As well as subsequent West End roles in Wicked, Legally Blonde: The Musical and The West End Men, Mead has pursued a music career, releasing four solo albums and undertaking concert tours in the UK and Japan.

In 2014, he joined the cast of the BBC One drama Casualty, playing the role of Ben 'Lofty' Chiltern, while continuing to tour the UK with his band between filming commitments. He returned to the stage in May 2016 as Caractacus Potts in the UK Tour of Chitty Chitty Bang Bang. In 2017, he returned to the role of Lofty, but in Casualty's sister series, the BBC One drama Holby City. 

On 9 November 2019 Lee sang Morning Has Broken at the Annual Remembrance Day celebration service at the Royal Albert Hall.

Early career
After studying at performing arts college, Mead gained his first professional stage experience in cabaret as a cruise ship singer on the Portsmouth to Bilbao ferry and then in a summer season at Bridlington Spa Theatre.  He moved into musical theatre in 2004, playing both Levi and the Pharaoh in the UK touring production of Joseph and the Amazing Technicolor Dreamcoat.  Following Joseph, Mead performed in the UK tours of Tommy (ensemble and first cover Tommy) and Miss Saigon (ensemble and first cover Chris) before joining the West End production of Phantom of the Opera as an ensemble player and understudy for the role of Raoul.

Any Dream Will Do/Joseph and the Amazing Technicolor Dreamcoat
While performing in The Phantom of the Opera, Mead auditioned for the BBC series Any Dream Will Do, hoping to win a six-month contract playing Joseph in the 2007 West End revival of Joseph and the Amazing Technicolor Dreamcoat.  From 10,000 initial auditionees, Mead was selected as one of the final 12 potential 'Josephs' who performed live on TV every Saturday night to win the public's vote.

Immediately after he won the final, a single featuring Mead, with fellow Any Dream Will Do finalists Lewis Bradley and Keith Jack, was released in aid of the BBC's annual Children In Need charity appeal.  The single, featuring Any Dream Will Do (performed by Mead) and Close Every Door (performed by all three finalists) reached number 2 in the official UK singles chart.

Joseph and the Amazing Technicolour Dreamcoat opened in the West End on 17 July 2007 to generally good reviews: "Lee Mead... turns out to be both talented and enthusiastic... what distinguishes him is an attractive singing voice and, coming from beneath hair that owes more to Uncle Esau than father Jacob, lots of affable charisma... last night's audience seemed enchanted" wrote Benedict Nightingale in The Times.

"Mead is in excellent form vocally" wrote The Stage's Lisa Martland. His performance of Close Every Door, "encapsulating both tenderness and defiance", was a highlight for her.

After 600 performances in the role, Mead played Joseph for the last time on 10 January 2009.

Post-Joseph career
Following his run as Joseph in the West End, Mead took a short course at the Lee Strasberg Theatre and Film Institute in New York City before taking on his first major play in a UK tour of Lord Arthur Savile's Crime.  The play, which was adapted by Trevor Baxter in the style of a tongue-in-cheek Victorian melodrama from a short story by Oscar Wilde, opened at the Theatre Royal Windsor on 12 January 2010 and finished at the Theatre Royal Bath on 24 April 2010.  Mead led the cast playing the title role alongside established performers including  Gary Wilmot, Kate O'Mara, David Ross and Derren Nesbitt.

Mead went on to appear in the role of Fiyero in the London production of Wicked, from 10 May 2010 to 5 February 2011 opposite Rachel Tucker as Elphaba, the Wicked Witch Of the West and Louise Dearman as Galinda, the Good Witch.  Mead was nominated for the Whatsonstage.com Theatregoers' Choice Award for Best Takeover in a Role for this role.

Mead then took over the role of Emmett in Legally Blonde in the West End from 20 June to 8 October 2011.  He made his television acting debut in August 2011, guest starring in an episode of Casualty on BBC One as newly employed teaching assistant Harry Timms  He also appeared in the second series of the science fiction drama, Bedlam, in the episode entitled "Jude" playing Scott, the brother of the title character, on Sky Living in June 2012.  In December 2012, he starred in his first pantomime as the title character "Jack" in Jack and the Beanstalk at the Mayflower Theatre, Southampton alongside Julian Clary and Nigel Havers.

Mead returned to the West End in May 2013, starring in The West End Men in concert at the Vaudeville Theatre alongside Matt Willis, Glenn Carter, Stephen Rahman-Hughes and David Thaxton. In December 2013, he starred in his second pantomime as "Robin" in Robin Hood at the Theatre Royal, Plymouth.

On 1 March 2014, he made his first appearance as Ben "Lofty" Chiltern in the BBC drama series Casualty. Mead was nominated as Favourite Newcomer in the 2014 TV Times Awards and shortlisted as Newcomer in the 2015 National Television Awards for this role. Alongside Casualty, Mead is continuing to tour the UK with his band, starred in his third pantomime as "Prince Charming" in Cinderella at the New Theatre, Cardiff in December 2014 and stars in his fourth as "Aladdin" in Aladdin at the Hippodrome, Birmingham in December 2015.

In 2016, Mead left Casualty to join the Chitty Chitty Bang Bang UK Tour as "Caractacus Potts" and ended the year playing "Prince Charming" in Cinderella at the London Palladium. In 2017 he joined the cast of Holby City, reprising his Casualty role. He remained as a series regular until his final episode aired on 17 December 2019.

In 2019, he made a guest appearance as himself in the second series of the BBC sitcom Motherland.

Filmography

Film & Television Credits

Theatre Credits

Concerts

UK and Ireland
Mead undertook his first solo concert in his home town of Southend in May 2010 and continued to tour the UK and Ireland during 2010 and 2011 with his own band.  A second tour, The Love Tour, followed in February 2012 to coincide with the release of his third album, Love Songs.  In the summer of 2012, Mead joined forces with Stephen Rahman-Hughes and Matt Rawle to tour as the West End Men, supported by special guest, Kerry Ellis.  A further short tour with the West End Men followed in November 2012 with Ramin Karimloo replacing Matt Rawle in the line-up.  Mead also starred in a month-long run of the West End Men from May to June 2013 at the Vaudeville Theatre in London.  

Mead completed further UK solo tours in the autumn of 2013 and in 2014 then in 2015, announced a new collaboration with Stephen Rahman-Hughes to form duo, Steve and Lee, their show Both Sides Now debuted in October of that year. Mead's new Some Enchanted Evening tour kicked off in July 2015, followed by the launch of his new album of the same name in February 2016, which is marked by a series of intimate London gigs with further UK-wide tour dates announced for March and October 2016. In November 2016, he joined other West End stars for two Broadway in Concert dates and a further Both Sides Now show with Stephen Rahman-Hughes. Mead has announced a monthly Up Front and Centre residency at London's Pheasantry throughout 2017, the first of its kind for the Chelsea cabaret venue.

Japan
Mead completed his first international concert tour of Japan in December 2011.

Guest appearances

Mead has appeared as a guest artist at a range of concerts and events.

Discography

Albums

Singles

Awards

Personal life
Mead was born in Southend-on-Sea to Joan (née Horning) and Stephen Mead. He has a younger brother, Casey Michael Mead, who is four years his junior.

In November 2007, Mead began dating Any Dream Will Do judge Denise van Outen. The couple married on 25 April 2009 and their daughter was born on 1 May 2010. In July 2013, the couple released a joint statement stating that they had separated.

Lee got engaged to girlfriend Issy on Sunday 5th February 2023.

Charity
Mead is the patron and active supporter of Equal People Performing Arts, a charity based in Rayleigh, Essex that makes the performing arts available to all, and brings together disabled and non-disabled children and young adults to socialise and perform.

He also was ambassador of Vodafone's 2008 Cut It Out Campaign in 2008 which aimed to reduce bullying. The campaign worked alongside the West End stage production of Joseph and the Amazing Technicolor Dreamcoat.  Children were invited to design their own 'dreamcoat' and the winning entries were then worn on stage by Mead during Anti-Bullying week.

References

External links
Official website
Lee Mead Appreciation Society (unofficial fan website)
Lee Mead Timeline (unofficial fan website and news archive)
Lee Mead's biography at Biogs.com

1981 births
English male musical theatre actors
Fascination Records artists
Living people
People from Southend-on-Sea
Reality casting show winners